Selo pri Zagorju is a settlement immediately east of Zagorje ob Savi in central Slovenia. The area is part of the traditional region of Upper Carniola. It is now included with the rest of the Municipality of Zagorje ob Savi in the Central Sava Statistical Region.

Name
The name of the settlement was changed from Selo to Selo pri Zagorju in 1953.

References

External links
Selo pri Zagorju on Geopedia

Populated places in the Municipality of Zagorje ob Savi